Ave Vagabundo is the 16th album by Mexican singer Verónica Castro. It was released in 1999.

Track listing
 "Alguien Que No Soy Yo" (Juan Bautista)
 "Mi Carta"
 "Amor Do un Rato"
 "Mexi, Mexi (Mexe, Mexe)"
 "Sacudelo (Mambo)"
 "Entre Dos Amores"
 "Ave Vagabundo (Nobre Vagabundo)"
 "Yo, el Tango y Tu"
 "Zumbalo"
 "Vaquero de Asfalto (Cowboy de Asfalto)"

Singles

1999 albums
Verónica Castro albums